Michael D. Sallah is an American investigative reporter who has twice been awarded the Pulitzer Prize.

Life
Sallah graduated from St. John's Jesuit High School, a college preparatory school in Ohio, and then obtained his undergraduate degree in journalism at the University of Toledo.

While working for The Toledo Blade, he received numerous state and national awards for his investigative stories into organized crime, clerical sexual abuse and white-collar fraud. He was named Best Reporter in Ohio in 2002 by the Society of Professional Journalists.

Two years later, Sallah and fellow reporters Mitch Weiss and Joe Mahr were awarded the 2004 Pulitzer Prize for Investigative Reporting for a series on the atrocities by Tiger Force, a U.S. Army platoon during the Vietnam War.

He became an investigative reporter and editor at the Miami Herald, where he directed numerous projects including a series on public housing corruption that won the 2007 Pulitzer Prize for Local Reporting.
He was a Pulitzer finalist for meritorious Public Service in 2012 for a series exposing wretched and deadly conditions in Florida's assisted living facilities. He worked two years at The Washington Post, and returned in 2014 to The Miami Herald, where he was a Pulitzer finalist for Local Reporting in 2016 for stories that exposed a corrupt police sting operation that laundered $71.5 million for drug cartels—kept millions in profits—but did not make a single arrest. He has received other national awards for his work in accountability journalism, including The IRE Medal, a Gerald Loeb Award, a Heywood Broun Award and a Robert F. Kennedy Journalism Award.

Works
With Mitch Weiss.
With Mitch Weiss. The Yankee Comandante: The Untold Story of Courage, Passion, and One American's Fight to Liberate Cuba.  Lyons Press, 2015.

References

External links
 Interview on Tiger Force at the Pritzker Military Museum & Library

Year of birth missing (living people)
Living people
American male journalists
American investigative journalists
Writers from Toledo, Ohio
University of Toledo alumni
Pulitzer Prize for Investigative Reporting winners
Pulitzer Prize for Local Reporting winners
Journalists from Ohio
Gerald Loeb Award winners for Small and Medium Newspapers